The Portland Marathon Presented by OHSU Health is an annual sporting event which takes place on the first Sunday of October in Portland, Oregon, first held in 1972. The race consists of a full marathon as well as a half marathon.  The race starts and ends at the Tom McCall Waterfront Park at Salmon Street and Naito Parkway, and includes several bridge crossings and multiple iconic landmarks in Portland.  The field has reached over 10,000 runners.

History 
The race has been held annually since 1972 and is one of the longest-running consecutive marathons in the United States. The inaugural race was held on Sauvie Island and attracted 86 participants.

The race route underwent various alterations in the 1970s and 1980s before solidifying on a course that traveled clockwise from downtown Portland to the St. Johns Bridge via Highway 30, and then down the bluff on Willamette Blvd before finishing back in the downtown area.

In 1991, Japan's Hiromi Yokoyama set the women's course record with her time of 2:36:40 hours.

In 1997, the men's course record of 2:17:21 hours was set by German runner Uli Steidl.  The oldest finisher was Mavis Lingren at age 90 in 1997.

Following a misconduct investigation in 2018 by the Oregon Department of Justice related to long-time race management personnel, the City of Portland issued a Request for Proposals to solicit a new race production firm to take over management of the event. In January 2019 the City selected Brooksee LLC, producers of the REVEL Race Series, as the new managers of the race.

It was announced in July 2019 that Oregon Health & Science University (OHSU) will be the presenting sponsor of the event for multiple years.

The 2019 event featured an entirely revised route.

The 2020 in-person edition of the race was cancelled due to the coronavirus pandemic, with all registrants given the option of running the race virtually or transferring their entry to 2021 or 2022.

Winners

Notes

References

External links
 Official website
 

Marathons in the United States
Sports in Portland, Oregon
Recurring sporting events established in 1972
Sports competitions in Oregon
1972 establishments in Oregon
Annual events in Portland, Oregon